In quantum physics, the scattering amplitude is the probability amplitude of the outgoing spherical wave relative to the incoming plane wave in a stationary-state scattering process. 
The plane wave is described by the wavefunction

The dimension of the scattering amplitude is length.

The scattering amplitude is a probability amplitude;  the differential cross-section as a function of scattering angle is given as its modulus squared,

X-rays
The scattering length for X-rays is the Thomson scattering length or classical electron radius,  0.

Neutrons

Quantum mechanical formalism
A quantum mechanical approach is given by the S matrix formalism.

Measurement
The scattering amplitude can be determined by the scattering length in the low-energy regime.

See also 
 Veneziano amplitude
 Plane wave expansion

References

Neutron
X-rays
Electron
Scattering
Diffraction